Ogbourne railway station was on the Midland and South Western Junction Railway in Wiltshire, England. The SM&AR and the S&CER had in 1884 amalgamated to form the M&SWJR.

History

Ogbourne station was sited on a curved section of track to the north of the village of Ogbourne St George. The station had a passing loop on the single track line, and this loop was lengthened by troops during the Second World War to handle the long trains and considerable movements on this railway that military activity brought.

There was also a siding at Ogbourne St. Andrew used by the nearby horse stables.

As a whole, traffic on the M&SWJR fell steeply after the Second World War and the line closed to passengers in 1961, with goods facilities withdrawn from this section of the line at the same time. The over-bridge formed a dangerous choke point on the road and was removed in 1964. No trace of the station now remains, the Swindon to Marlborough A346 road having been realigned to run on the former railway route in 1969–1970. The road now passes over what was the station forecourt and the small freight yard, which had a loading dock for local cattle that had been herded down the village high street en route to Swindon market.

Route

References

Disused railway stations in Wiltshire
Former Midland and South Western Junction Railway stations
Railway stations in Great Britain opened in 1881
Railway stations in Great Britain closed in 1961
1881 establishments in England